Lisa Thompson (born 1973) is an English children's book author.

Biography

Thompson was born and raised in the London Borough of Havering (Hornchurch, Upminster), England. After leaving school at age 16, she worked in insurance for a couple of years. In 1991, she joined the BBC, eventually becoming a radio broadcast assistant. She left the BBC in 2002 and later became a freelance radio broadcast assistant with an independent production company. At age 43, Thompson debuted her first book.

Writing 
Thompson's debut novel, The Goldfish Boy, was published by Scholastic in 2017. A review in Kirkus wrote that the book "strikes the perfect balance, seemingly without compromise, between an issue-driven novel and one with broad, commercial appeal." The Goldfish Boy was a national bestseller and was shortlisted for the Waterstones Children's Book Prize.

The following year, Thompson published The Light Jar. The book was described in The Guardian as a "a thoughtful and hugely empathetic book". It was followed by The Day I Was Erased (2019) and The Boy Who Fooled the World (2020).

Thompson's first novella, Owen and the Soldier (2019), was published by Barrington Stoke and became the first dyslexia-friendly title to be shortlisted for the Blue Peter Book Awards. That same year, Thompson contributed a short story to Return to Wonderland, a collection of new stories set in Lewis Carroll's fictional world.

Her second novella, The House of Clouds, was published in 2020, and in 2021 The Graveyard Riddle (which revisited characters from her first novel, The Goldfish Boy) was followed by her third novella, The Small Things.

The Rollercoaster Boy was released in 2022 and was followed by Sidney Makes a Wish, a story for younger children with illustrations by Jess Rose, and was her fourth book for Barrington Stoke.

Personal life 
Thompson is married to Stuart and they have two children, Ben and Isobel.

Published works

Novels

Novellas

For younger children

Short stories

References

External links
 

1973 births
People from Hornchurch
21st-century English women writers
English children's writers
Living people